Piigandi may refer to several places in Estonia:
Piigandi, Põlva County, village in Estonia
Piigandi, Tartu County, village in Estonia